All Creatures Great and Small is a 1975 British film (copyrighted in 1974), directed by Claude Whatham and starring Simon Ward and Anthony Hopkins as Yorkshire vets James Herriot and Siegfried Farnon. It is based on the first two James Herriot novels (actually written by veterinary surgeon Alf Wight): If Only They Could Talk (1970) and It Shouldn't Happen to a Vet (1972).

The film was given the same title as the 1972 US compilation volume of these two novels. It is the first of a series of films and television series based on Herriot's work. A sequel was released in 1976, somewhat confusingly titled It Shouldn't Happen to a Vet, although it actually covers the two following novels, Let Sleeping Vets Lie and Vet in Harness.

Premise
In 1937, newly qualified vet James Herriot travels to Yorkshire for the post of assistant in Siegfried Farnon’s practice. He learns the facts of country life, but has to overcome the prejudices of the Darrowby locals who are sceptical of the novice vet's ability. In between cases, Herriot courts farmer’s daughter Helen Alderson.

Main cast
 
 Simon Ward as James Herriot
 Anthony Hopkins as Siegfried Farnon
 Lisa Harrow as Helen Alderson
 Brian Stirner as Tristan Farnon
 Freddie Jones as Cranford
 T. P. McKenna as Soames
 Brenda Bruce as Miss Harbottle
 John Collin as Mr Alderson
 Christine Buckley as Mrs Hall
 Jane Collins as Connie
 Fred Feast as Farmer in Cinema
 Glynne Geldart as Joyce
 Harold Goodwin as Dinsdale's Uncle
 Doreen Mantle as Mrs Seaton
 John Nettleton as Head Waiter
 Daphne Oxenford as Mrs Pumphrey
 Bert Palmer as Mr Dean
 John Rees as Geoff Mallock
 Jenny Runacre as Pamela
 Jane Solo as Brenda

Production

Development
All Creatures Great and Small was a best seller in the US and film rights were optioned.

The film was made for NBC's Hallmark Hall of Fame but it was theatrically released outside the US. The producers were Duane Bogie for FCB Productions and David Susskind for the Talent Associates.

According to one account, the budget was $1.2 million, nearly twice what NBC paid for it. Another account said the budget was $1 million, with $650,000 from NBC, $250,000 from EMI (who distributed), and $100,000 privately raised.

The lead role was given to Simon Ward, who later recalled, "I hadn't known the books and a lot of people hadn't known about them then, so at that time I wasn't taking on a national icon. It's always nerve-wracking playing a real person particularly if that real person is still alive and comes and sits on set watching you. Although Herriot was the most charming wonderful man who I really adored and kept in touch with till he died."

Shooting
Filming started in May 1974, in the town of Malton, North Riding of Yorkshire. Studio work was done in London.

Ward said "The roughest thing was putting a hand up a pregnant mare... for the film I had to do it again and again."

Music
The film's incidental music was by Wilfred Josephs.

Release

Critical
Having passed the British censors in September 1974, the film was not released until 9 May 1975, when it opened in London at the small cinema Studio Two in Oxford Street. The Times' film critic David Robinson did not like it ("'All Creatures Great and Small' is so wholesome and warmhearted it makes you want to scream. Not on account of these qualities in themselves, but because of the director's (Claude Whatham) inability to give them any more depth or meaning than a television series"), but acknowledged that Anthony Hopkins' and Simon Ward's playing made their characters somewhat believable.

"It works beautifully," said the New York Times.

Home media
The film has been released on DVD for both Region 2 PAL and Region 1 NTSC.

Sequel

A second film, It Shouldn't Happen to a Vet was released in 1976. John Alderton took over the role of James and Colin Blakely that of Siegfried, while Lisa Harrow returned as Helen. The film was directed by Eric Till from a script by Alan Plater.

Starting in 1978, there was a TV series based on the book, which was a huge ratings success in Britain and ran until 1990.

References

External links
 
 
 
 Official James Herriot Website

1975 films
British drama films
Films based on multiple works of a series
Films set in Yorkshire
Medical-themed films
EMI Films films
Films set in 1937
1970s English-language films
Films directed by Claude Whatham
1970s British films